The dark barsided skink (Concinnia martini)  is a species of skink found in Queensland and New South Wales in Australia.

References

Concinnia
Reptiles described in 1985
Taxa named by Richard Walter Wells
Taxa named by Cliff Ross Wellington